A list of films produced in Finland ordered by year of release. For an alphabetical list of Finnish films see :Category:Finnish films

The numbers in the Notes column refer to the numbering used by Suomen kansallisfilmografia. These numbers are given to all full-length films which have been shown in public theaters as a headlining or co-headlining film. Suomen kansallisfilmografia uses the minimum length of 37 minutes to qualify for a film to be listed, however the earliest films may be shorter than this (as 37 minutes was not even technically possible).

References

External links
 Finnish film at the Internet Movie Database

1917
1910s in Finland
1920s in Finland
1930s in Finland